Crimes of Passion is the English collective title for a series of six feature-length crime films released in 2013, based on six of the early novels of the prolific Swedish crime novelist Maria Lang (real name Dagmar Lange), written in the late 1940s and early 1950s. The films were co-produced by Svensk Filmindustri and Swedish commercial broadcaster TV4.

The first film was released in Swedish cinemas on 8 March 2013, and received indifferent or poor reviews from most Swedish critics. The remaining five were released on DVD in Sweden during the autumn of 2013 and were all made available on TV4's subscription video on demand service TV4 Play Premium in June 2014. In October and November 2014, the six films were shown on TV4's DTTV service.

On 11 December 2013 BBC Four announced that it had bought the British broadcasting rights to Crimes of Passion, with the series premiering on BBC Four on 30 August 2014. The films have been described as Mad Men meeting The Killing.

Plot
Set mainly in Bergslagen in the 1950s, the films follow Puck Ekstedt (Tuva Novotny), her boyfriend (and later husband) Einar Bure (Linus Wahlgren), nicknamed Eje, and their friend, police superintendent Christer Wijk (Ola Rapace), as they solve various crimes.

Main cast
 Tuva Novotny as Puck Ekstedt, a literature student dating and later married to Einar.
 Linus Wahlgren as Einar Bure, called Eje, Puck's boyfriend and later husband, and Christer's best friend.
 Ola Rapace as Christer Wijk, a police superintendent living in Stockholm.

Music
The title sequence theme music to the series was written and produced by artists Frid & Frid (aka brothers Karl Frid & Pär Frid), and was sung by Isabella Lundgren. Frid & Frid also contributed most of the other incidental music throughout the six film episodes.

Production
The series was made by Pampas Produktion AB for Swedish television network TV4. Crimes of Passion is produced by Reneé Axö and the films are directed by Birger Larsen, Christian Eklöw, Christopher Panov, Molly Hartleb and Peter Schildt.

Episode list

References

External links
Crimes of Passion – booklet
Crimes of Passion – trailer

Episode 1: 
Episode 2: 
Episode 3: 
Episode 4: 
Episode 5: 
Episode 6: 

Swedish crime television series
BBC television dramas
2013 Swedish television series debuts
2013 Swedish television series endings
2013 British television series debuts
2013 British television series endings
Films about fictional Nobel laureates